Meagher, Gummow & Lehane's Equity: Doctrines and Remedies is a scholarly legal text originally composed by three Australian judges, Roderick Meagher, William Gummow and John Lehane. It is the preeminent publication on Equity in both Australia and England. 

The book is now in its fifth edition. The current authors are Dyson Heydon QC (former Justice of the High Court of Australia), Justice Mark Leeming (a Judge of the New South Wales Court of Appeal) and Dr Peter Turner (a Fellow at the University of Melbourne). 

The book is divided into the following parts:
The Background of Equity
The Basic Concepts of Equity
Assurances and Assignments
Unconscionable Transactions
Remedies
Deceased Estates
Equitable Defences
Miscellaneous Doctrines

Publishing details
 RP Meagher, WMC Gummow and JRF Lehane, Equity, Doctrines and Remedies (Butterworths, 1st ed, 1984) 
 JD Heydon, MJ Leeming, PG Turner, Meagher, Gummow & Lehane's Equity: Doctrine and Remedies (LexisNexis, 5th ed, 2015).

References

Law of Australia
Australian non-fiction books
Law books